The men's 100 metre individual medley event at the 11th FINA World Swimming Championships (25m) took place 15 – 16 December 2012 at the Sinan Erdem Dome.  The final was won by American Ryan Lochte in a time of 51.21.  In the semifinals, Lochte broke Peter Mankoč's world record of 50.76 set in 2009 with a time of 50.71.

Records
Prior to this competition, the existing world and championship records were as follows:

The following records were established during the competition:

Results

Heats

Semifinals

Final

The final was held at 19:37.

References

Individual medley 100 metre, men's
World Swimming Championships (25 m)